In 2002, the Fields Institute initiated its fellowship program to recognize outstanding contributions to activities at the Fields Institute and within the Canadian mathematical community. The following is a list of fellows of the Fields Institute by year of appointment.

Fellows

References

2002 establishments in Canada
Academic awards
Canadian awards
Fields
Fields Institute